In Britain in the period from the 1680s to the 1740s, and especially under the Walpole ministry from 1730 to 1743, the Country Party was a coalition of Tories and disaffected Whigs. It was a movement rather than an organised party and had no formal structure or leaders. It claimed to be a nonpartisan force fighting for the nation's interest—the whole "country"—against the self-interested actions of the Court Party, that is the politicians in power in London. Country men believed the Court Party was corrupting Britain by using patronage to buy support and was threatening English and Scottish liberties and the proper balance of authority by shifting power from Parliament to the  prime minister. It sought to constrain the court by opposing standing armies, calling for annual elections to Parliament (instead of the seven-year term in effect), and wanted to fix power in the hands of the landed gentry rather than the royal officials, urban merchants or bankers. It opposed any practices it saw as corruption.

The Country Party attracted a number of influential writers (such as Jonathan Swift, Samuel Johnson, and Andrew Fletcher of Saltoun) and political theorists.  The ideology of the party faded away in England but became a powerful force in the American colonies, where its tracts strongly motivated the Patriots to oppose what the Country Party had cast as British monarchical tyranny and to develop a powerful political philosophy of republicanism in the United States.

Historically, the name "Country Party" was used by what became the Whig Party itself in its initial stages, when headed by the Earl of Shaftesbury during the Exclusion Crisis of 1679-1681. Then, the term "whiggamor", shortened to "Whig", started being applied to the party – first as a pejorative term, then adopted and taken up by the party itself. The name "Country Party" was thus discarded – to be taken up later by opponents of the Whig Party itself, once it had come to dominate British politics following the Glorious Revolution.

Country persuasion

The historian Hoppit has interpreted that around 1700 instead of a country "party", the English electorate, its Lords and its elected representatives had a country persuasion with key consensus demands that the government should be frugal and efficient, opposition to high taxes, a concern for personal liberty, a quest for more frequent elections, a faith that the local militia would substitute for a dangerous standing army, a desire for such moral reforms as temperance in an age of drunkenness, and less Sabbath breaking. The country leaders stressed the civic duty of the upper class to engage in politics to strengthen the national interest.  Such views amount to the main counter to extreme High Tory hegemony and the similar bigwig Whig Party cabal which in its estimation morphed via other executives into the Walpole executive placemen.

Bolingbroke
Henry St John, 1st Viscount Bolingbroke was especially influential in stating the need and outlining the machinery of a systematic parliamentary opposition. Such an opposition he called a "country party" which he opposed to the court party. Country parties had been formed before, for instance after the king's speech to Parliament in November 1685, but Bolingbroke was the first to state the need for a continual opposition to the government. To his mind the spirit of liberty was threatened by the court party's lust for power.

Liberty could only be safeguarded by an opposition party that used "constitutional methods and a legal course of opposition to the excesses of legal and ministerial power…". He instructed the opposition party to "Wrest the power of government, if you can, out of the hands that employed it weakly and wickedly" This work could be done only by a homogeneous party "…because such a party alone will submit to a drudgery of this kind". It did not suffice to be eager to speak, keen to act. "They who affect to head an opposition, …, must be equal, at least, to those whom they oppose…". The opposition had to be of a permanent nature to make sure that it would be looked at as a part of daily politics. It had to contrast, on every occasion, the government. He considered a party that systematically opposed the government to be more appealing than a party that occasionally opposed the government. This opposition had to prepare itself to control government.

Americans
The writings of the country party were eagerly devoured by some American colonists who came to fear the corruption of the English court as the greatest threat to the colonies’ desired liberties. They formed a Patriot cause in the Thirteen Colonies and used the country party ideas to help form Republicanism in the United States. Hutson identified country ideology as a major influence on the Antifederalists during the debate over the ratification of the United States Constitution. Similarly, Jeffersonianism inherited the country party attack on elitism, centralization, and distant government during the ascent of Alexander Hamilton and other Federalists.

See also

Notes

Bibliography
 
 
 
 
 
 
 
 
 
 
 
 
 
 

1726 establishments in Great Britain
1752 disestablishments in Great Britain
Political parties established in 1726
Political parties disestablished in 1752
Country Party
Political ideologies
Political culture
Political history of England
Politics of the Kingdom of Great Britain
Defunct political parties in the United Kingdom